Can't Run from Yourself is the twentieth studio album by American country music singer Tanya Tucker, released on October 6, 1992. There were three Billboard Top Ten Country Singles from Can't Run from Yourself: "It's a Little Too Late" and "Two Sparrows in a Hurricane" both at #2, and "Tell Me About It," a duet with Delbert McClinton, at #4. The album peaked at #12 on the Country Albums chart. Tammy Wynette would later cover "What Do They Know" for her 1994 album Without Walls.

Brian Mansfield of Allmusic rated it three stars out of five, saying that it was more "consistent" than her previous album.

Track listing

Personnel
Tanya Tucker - vocals
Larry Byrom - acoustic guitar
Beth Nielsen Chapman - backing vocals
Carol Chase - backing vocals
Dan Dugmore - steel guitar
Sonny Garrish - steel guitar
Greg Gordon - backing vocals 
Rob Hajacos - fiddle
David Hungate - bass guitar
John Barlow Jarvis - piano
Craig Krampf - drums
Mike Lawler - keyboards, synthesizer
Paul Leim - drums
Brent Mason - electric guitar
Delbert McClinton - duet vocals on "Tell Me About It"
Terry McMillan - harmonica
Jonell Mosser - backing vocals
Louis Dean Nunley - backing vocals
Bobby Ogdin - piano, synthesizer
Wayland Patton - backing vocals
Cindy Richardson-Walker - backing vocals
Tom Roady - percussion
Matt Rollings - keyboards
Brent Rowan - electric guitar, mandolin
Billy Joe Walker Jr. - acoustic guitar
Bob Wray - bass guitar
Reggie Young - electric guitar

Chart performance

References

1992 albums
Liberty Records albums
Tanya Tucker albums
Albums produced by Jerry Crutchfield